Arsinspor is a sports club located in Trabzon, Turkey. The football club plays in the Regional Amateur League.

Current squad

Starred players have Turkish citizenship also.

References

 
Sport in Trabzon
Football clubs in Turkey
Association football clubs established in 1973
1973 establishments in Turkey